Brit Awards 2002 was the 22nd edition of the Brit Awards, an annual pop music awards ceremony in the United Kingdom. It was organised by the British Phonographic Industry and took place on 20 February 2002 at Earls Court in London. first present year in International Album.

Performances

Winners and nominees

Outstanding Contribution to Music
Sting

Multiple nominations and awards

References

External links
Brit Awards 2002 at Brits.co.uk

Brit Awards
Brit Awards, 2002
Brit Awards, 2002
Brit Awards
Brit
Brit Awards